Giannis Nikopolidis (born 8 December 2000) is a Greek professional footballer who plays as a goalkeeper for Super League club Lamia.

College career

Professional career

New York Red Bulls II
On 11 January 2022, Nikopolidis was drafted by the New York Red Bulls II with the 71st pick in the 2022 MLS SuperDraft.  Nikopolidis, officially signed his first contract with the club on 2 March. Nikopolidis made his professional debut on 2 April 2022, during a 3-2 loss to FC Tulsa. Nikopolidis earned his first professional shutout on 15 July 2022, during a 1-0 win over Indy Eleven.

Lamia 
Nikopolidis signed with Greek Super League side Lamia in January 2023. He was named to the bench for Lamia's 2–1 Greek Football Cup quarterfinal win vs. Apollon Paralimnio.

Personal life
Nikopolidis is the son of former Greece national football team goalkeeper and UEFA Euro 2004 champion, Antonios Nikopolidis.

References

Living people
2000 births
New York Red Bulls draft picks
New York Red Bulls II players
Georgetown Hoyas men's soccer players
Greece youth international footballers
USL Championship players
Footballers from Athens
Greek footballers